Farkhar (also Romanized as Farkhār) is a village in Taghenkoh-e Shomali Rural District, Taghenkoh District, Firuzeh County, Razavi Khorasan Province, Iran. At the 2006 census, its population was 937, in 221 families.

References 

Populated places in Firuzeh County